The Rose and Crown is a Grade II listed public house at London Road, Isleworth, London.

It was built in the 18th century, with 19th century additions.

References

Grade II listed buildings in the London Borough of Hounslow
Grade II listed pubs in London
Isleworth
Pubs in the London Borough of Hounslow